Joée (born Joey DeSimone) is a Canadian dance musician who enjoyed success in the late 1990s.

Musical career
Joée scored several hits on the Canadian Singles Chart, including "Angel" and "If I Could", along with "Do You Right" in 1998 and "Arriba" in 1999. He released his debut album Truth in 1998, and was nominated for a Juno Award in 2000 for Best Dance Recording. With John Marmora, Joée received a 2001 SOCAN award for best dance music.

A follow-up self-titled album was released in 2002 on Erotico Music (distributed by Universal Music Canada).

Discography

Studio albums

Singles

References 

Living people
Canadian pop musicians
Year of birth missing (living people)
Musicians from Toronto
21st-century Canadian male singers